"Hairdo" is the second single released from Little Birdy's third album, Confetti.  It was released on 28 July 2009.

The video was filmed in a warehouse at Melbourne's Docklands and was directed by D'Arcy Foley-Dawson.

Track listing

Release history

References

2009 singles
Little Birdy songs
2009 songs
Eleven: A Music Company singles
Songs written by Katy Steele